A Beautiful Now is a 2015 American comedy-drama film written and directed by Daniela Amavia and starring Abigail Spencer. It is Amavia's directorial debut.

Plot Summary
A beautiful dancer balances on the razor's edge between reality and fantasy as she asks her friends to help her figure out the passions and relationship that have shaped who they are and who they will become.

Cast
 Abigail Spencer as Romy
 Hana Hayes as Young Romy
 Cheyenne Jackson as David
 Collette Wolfe as Ella
 Elena Satine as Jaki
 Sonja Kinski as Jessica
 Patrick Heusinger as Aaron
 Guy Burnet as Steve
 John Patrick Amedori as Chris
 Deborah Geffner as David's mother
 Ali Cobrin as Tracey
 Assaf Cohen as Ali
 Bobby Slayton as Mr. Rich
 Jordan Black as Cody
 Victor Turpin as Ricardo

Reception
Keith Watson of Slant Magazine awarded the film one and a half stars out of four.

References

External links
 
 

American comedy-drama films
2015 directorial debut films
2015 films
2015 comedy-drama films
2010s English-language films
2010s American films